Vavozhsky District (Vavož joros) is an administrative and municipal district (raion), one of the twenty-five in the Udmurt Republic, Russia. It is located in the southwest of the republic. Its administrative center is the rural locality (a selo) of Vavozh. Population:  17,323 (2002 Census);  The population of the administrative center accounts for 35.6% of the district's total population.

References

Notes

Sources

Districts of Udmurtia